The 1952 United States elections were held on November 4, 1952. The Republicans took control of the presidency and both chambers of Congress for the first time since the Great Depression. The election took place during the Korean War.

Republican nominee Five-star general Dwight D. Eisenhower defeated Democratic Governor Adlai Stevenson of Illinois. Eisenhower won the popular vote by eleven points, and carried every state outside the South. Eisenhower took the Republican nomination on the first ballot, defeating Ohio Senator Robert A. Taft and California Governor Earl Warren. After incumbent president Harry S. Truman declined to seek re-election, Stevenson won the Democratic nomination on the third ballot, defeating Tennessee Senator Estes Kefauver, Georgia Senator Richard Russell Jr., and former Commerce Secretary W. Averell Harriman. Eisenhower was the first professional soldier to be elected president since Ulysses S. Grant.

The Republicans gained twenty-two seats in the U.S. House of Representatives, gaining a majority over the Democrats. The House elections took place after the 1950 United States Census and the subsequent Congressional re-apportionment. The Republicans also became the majority in the U.S. Senate, gaining two seats.

The longevity of Democratic rule of the White House and the unpopularity of President Truman and the war in Korea are credited for the Republican sweep. 

As of 2022, this marked the third and final time in American history where one party flipped both chambers of Congress and the Presidency in a single election, along with 1800 and 1840. This would be the last time the Republicans won the Senate majority until 1980 and the last time they would win the House majority until 1994. This was the first presidential election where the winning Republican had coattails in both houses of Congress since 1928, and the second consecutive election with coattails in both houses. This is the last time the House changed hands in a presidential year, and the last time both houses simultaneously did so.

See also
1952 United States presidential election
1952 United States House of Representatives elections
1952 United States Senate elections
1952 United States gubernatorial elections

References

 
1952